Kurt Eminger (born 21 August 1935) is an Austrian speed skater. He competed in three events at the 1956 Winter Olympics.

References

1935 births
Living people
Austrian male speed skaters
Olympic speed skaters of Austria
Speed skaters at the 1956 Winter Olympics
Place of birth missing (living people)